Phillipa Finch (née Duncan; born 24 December 1981 in Balclutha, New Zealand) is a New Zealand netball player. Finch has been added to the Southern Steel squad for the 2012 ANZ Championship season to replace the pregnant Wendy Frew.  She previously played with the Otago Rebels in the National Bank Cup from 2001. With the start of the ANZ Championship, Finch was signed with the Canterbury Tactix, although she continued to play provincial netball with Otago. Finch was also included in the New Zealand Accelerant Squad, which replaced the New Zealand A netball team in 2008.

References

External links
2010 ANZ Championship profile
2009–10 Netball New Zealand Accelerant Group team profile

New Zealand netball players
Southern Steel players
Mainland Tactix players
1981 births
Living people
Sportspeople from Balclutha, New Zealand
ANZ Championship players
Otago Rebels players